Dindicodes costiflavens is a moth of the family Geometridae first described by Wehrli in 1933. It is found in western China.

References

Moths described in 1933
Pseudoterpnini